Intiraymi or Inti Raymi may refer to:

Inti Raymi, Incan festival
Manu Intiraymi (born 1978), American television and theatre actor
Intiraymi Airport, Bolivian airport
Naoto Inti Raymi (born 1979), Japanese singer-songwriter